Norman Andrew "Nick" Cullop (September 17, 1887 – April 15, 1961) was a starting pitcher who played in Major League Baseball between  and . A native of Chilhowie, Virginia, Cullop batted and threw left-handed. He is not related to outfielder Nick Cullop.

Career
Cullop started his professional career with Salt Lake City (PCL) and reached the majors in 1913 with the Cleveland Naps, spending part of two seasons with them before moving to the Kansas City Packers (1914–1915), New York Yankees (1916–1917) and St. Louis Browns (1921). His most productive season came in 1915 with Kansas City in the outlaw Federal League, when he recorded career-numbers in wins (22) and innings pitched. With the 1916 Yankees he went 13–6 with 77 strikeouts and led the team with a 2.05 ERA, which was also a career-high.  Cullop also had the dubious distinction of losing 20 games in 1914, and splitting his 20 losses between two leagues, losing one game for the American League Naps and 19 for the Federal League Packers.

In a six-season career, Cullop posted a 57–55 record with 400 strikeouts and a 2.73 ERA in 1024.0 innings, including nine shutouts and 62 complete games. Cullop died in Tazewell, Virginia at the age of 73.

References

External links

Retrosheet

1887 births
1961 deaths
Baseball players from Virginia
Cleveland Naps players
Kansas City Packers players
Major League Baseball pitchers
New York Yankees players
People from Chilhowie, Virginia
St. Louis Browns players
Knoxville Appalachians players
Bristol Boosters players
Salt Lake City Bees players
Louisville Colonels (minor league) players
Dayton Aviators players